was a town located in Ogasa District, Shizuoka Prefecture, Japan.

As of April 1, 2005, the town had an estimated population of 12,369 and a density of 367 persons per km². The total area was 33.71 km². Its main agricultural products were green tea, melons, and strawberrys.

On April 1, 2005, Ōsuka, along with the town of Daitō (also from Ogasa District), was merged into the expanded city of Kakegawa.

During the Edo period, Ōsuka was the center of Yokosuka Domain. The town was formed in 1956 through the merger of former Yokosuka Town with Obuchi Village.

External links
 Kakegawa official website 

Dissolved municipalities of Shizuoka Prefecture
Kakegawa, Shizuoka